The Russian Orthodox Cemetery, Nice also known as the Orthodox cemetery in Caucade, is a cemetery located southwest of Nice, France .

History and description
The cemetery was established on a plot bought by Russia in 1867 on the hill of Caucade, at a time when the Russian colony had an important role in the French Riviera.

3,000 Russians, including the descendants of Russian immigrants and refugees after the October Revolution and the members of Royal families, are buried at the cemetery. This includes Galitzine, Naryshkin, Obolensky, Volkonsky, Tsereteli and Gagarin  families.

The cemetery chapel is dedicated to Saint Nicholas, in honor of the patron Nicholas Alexandrovich, Tsarevich of Russia who died of tuberculosis in Nice.

The cemetery is open on Thursday and Saturday from 9:00 to 12:00 and on Friday and Sunday from 14:00 to 17:00. Liturgy on Saturday at 9:30. (Bus line 8 - station Caucade).

Notables buried
 Princess Catherine Dolgorukaya-Yurievskaya (1847–1922)
 Vladimir Golenishchev (1856–1947), Russian Egyptologist
 Princess Helen of Serbia (1884–1962)
 Magnus Hirschfeld (1868–1935), German physician, sexologist and LGBT rights activist
 Prince Rostislav Alexandrovich Romanov (1902–1978)
 General Dmitry Shcherbachev, (1857–1932)
 General Nikolai Yudenich (1862–1933)

Gallery

External links and references 
 History
 Nice (06) : cimetière de Caucade – Cimetières de France et d'ailleurs
 

Cemeteries in France
Eastern Orthodox cemeteries
Religious buildings and structures in Nice
Christianity in Nice
Tourist attractions in Nice
Eastern Orthodoxy in France
Russian cemeteries
Russian diaspora in France
1867 establishments in France